The 2023 BW Open is a professional tennis tournament played on hard courts. It is the first edition of the tournament which was part of the 2023 ATP Challenger Tour. It took place in Ottignies-Louvain-la-Neuve, Belgium between 24 and 29 January 2023.

Singles main-draw entrants

Seeds

 1 Rankings are as of 16 January 2023.

Other entrants
The following players received wildcards into the singles main draw:
  Raphaël Collignon
  David Goffin
  Valentin Vacherot

The following players received entry into the singles main draw as alternates:
  Kimmer Coppejans
  Nino Serdarušić

The following players received entry from the qualifying draw:
  Andrea Arnaboldi
  Tibo Colson
  Joris De Loore
  Kenny de Schepper
  Gauthier Onclin
  Mikael Ymer

The following players received entry as lucky losers:
  Altuğ Çelikbilek
  Ernests Gulbis
  Cem İlkel
  Alibek Kachmazov

Champions

Singles

 David Goffin def.  Mikael Ymer 6–4, 6–1.

Doubles

 Romain Arneodo /  Tristan-Samuel Weissborn def.  Roman Jebavý /  Adam Pavlásek 6–4, 6–3.

References

2023 ATP Challenger Tour
2023 in Belgian sport
January 2023 sports events in Europe